A drug-eluting stent (DES) is a peripheral or coronary stent (a scaffold) placed into narrowed, diseased peripheral or coronary arteries that slowly release a drug to block cell proliferation. This prevents fibrosis that, together with clots (thrombi), could otherwise block the stented artery, a process called restenosis.  The stent is usually placed within the peripheral or coronary artery by an interventional cardiologist or interventional radiologist during an angioplasty procedure.

Drug-eluting stents in current clinical use were approved by the FDA after clinical trials showed they were statistically superior to bare-metal stents for the treatment of native coronary artery narrowings, having lower rates of major adverse cardiac events  (usually defined as a composite clinical endpoint of death + myocardial infarction + repeat intervention because of restenosis). The first drug-eluting stents to be approved in Europe and the U.S. were coated with paclitaxel or an mTOR inhibitor, such as sirolimus.

Indications

Considerations for use 
It is crucial to identify patients who are good candidates for procedural intervention. Generally, patients without symptoms of coronary blockage or without evidence of ischemia (oxygen deprivation) on labs and imaging are not subjected to stent procedures, as the complications and risks of such a procedure would outweigh any potential benefit.

Procedural intervention, such as angioplasty or stent placement, is reserved for patients with clinical symptoms of coronary artery flow reduction or observable coronary artery obstruction on imaging. This is otherwise known as a myocardial infarction (heart attack). These symptoms can include, but are not limited to:

 Severe, pressure-like chest pain unrelieved by rest
 Shortness of breath, fatigue, lightheadedness
 Palpitations
 Atypical symptoms: nausea, vomiting, indigestion, confusion, back pain

There are two major classifications of myocardial infarction (MI): ST-elevation MI vs. non-ST elevation. The criteria for diagnosis are beyond the scope of this article, but it is important to note that stenting is considered first-line therapy for patients diagnosed with a STEMI.

Contraindications 
The only absolute contraindication to stent placement is significant active bleeding. This is due primarily to the need for in-procedure anticoagulation and dual antiplatelet therapy during the recovery period. Other considerations that could prevent the use of stents include a history of in-stent restenosis, bleeding diathesis (high susceptibility to bleed), complex or unsuitable coronary anatomy, and/or a short life expectancy due to other medical conditions.

Off-label use 
Drug-eluting stents also have been shown to be superior to bare-metal stents in reducing short-term complications of stenting in saphenous vein grafts; however, use in these bypass grafts is an example of "off-label" use of drug-eluting stents.  That is, this application has not been sufficiently examined by the Food and Drug Administration for that agency to recommend the use.  For "on-label" applications, the FDA "believes that coronary drug-eluting stents remain safe and effective when used for the FDA-approved indications. These devices have significantly reduced the need for a second surgery to treat restenosis for thousands of patients each year."

Some concern has been expressed about the overzealous use of stents in general. Two studies found about half of patients received stents for unapproved reasons, with worse outcomes for the patients in both studies.  More recent data suggest off-label use of both bare-metal stents and drug-eluting stents brings increased risks.  However, drug-eluting stents seemed to have similar or improved rates of death or myocardial infarction compared with bare-metal stents, and consistently reduced the need for target vessel revascularization.  Overall, the data support the use of drug-eluting stents for off-label indications.

Efficacy

Benefits 
Drug-eluting stents (DES) have been extensively studied, and are generally superior to bare-metal stents concerning the occurrence of major adverse cardiac events (generally defined as death, myocardial infarction, or the need for a repeat revascularization procedure).  In a 2019 meta-analysis comparing new generation DES to BMS, 26,616 patients spanning 20 randomized clinical trials were evaluated for primary outcomes of myocardial infarction and cardiac death. Those who received DES had a significantly reduced risk of myocardial infarction and cardiac mortality at 1 year. The superiority of newer generation polymer stents, particularly the cobalt chromium everolimus-eluting stents have been well-studied.

One of the major benefits of drug-eluting stents (DES) to bare-metal stents (BMS) is the prevention of in-stent restenosis (ISR). Restenosis is a gradual re-narrowing of the stented segment that occurs most commonly between 3–12 months after stent placement. High rates of restenosis associated with BMS prompted the development of DES, which resulted in a reduction of ISR incidence to around 5-10%. Continued development of newer generation DES have resulted in the near-elimination of BMS from clinical practice.

Long term outcomes 
Data on long term effects of DES is limited. This is primarily because the technology has only been around for the last two decades, so many studies investigating long-term outcomes have yet to be concluded. However, there are a number of studies investigating intermediate-term outcomes. One particular meta-analysis looked at 52,158 patients across 51 trials. At a median 3.8 years follow up, all DES demonstrated superior efficacy compared to BMS, resulting in lower rates of revascularization procedures. Among DES, newer-generation devices had substantially improved safety outcomes, specifically in regards to stent thrombosis, recurrent MIs, or death. In another 2016 trial, 9,013 patients who received either DES or BMS to treat coronary artery disease were followed at 6 years in order to determine differences in rates of all-cause mortality (death from any cause) as well as frequency of repeat revascularization, stent thrombosis, and quality of life measures. At 6 years, there were no significant differences in all-cause mortality or quality of life measures. However, rates of repeat revascularization and stent thrombosis were significantly lower in those who received DES as opposed to BMS.

Adverse effects

Risks
Like all invasive medical procedures, stent placement carries certain risks. Risks associated with cardiac catheterization procedures include bleeding, allergic reaction to the X-ray contrast agents used to visualize the coronary arteries, and myocardial infarction. With PCI, the requirement for emergency CABG has markedly decreased since the days of balloon angioplasty, such that in some communities, coronary stenting is permitted in hospitals without on-site cardiac surgery facilities. This remains controversial in the United States because of the rare but unpredictable risk of coronary artery perforation. Rarely, a type of allergic reaction to the drug may occur; episodes of fatality have been reported.

Stent thrombosis 
One of the most feared complications of coronary stenting is stent thrombosis. This occurs when a new clot forms within the stent and occludes blood flow, causing another heart attack. Treatment for stent thrombosis is emergent revascularization; however, this is only achieved in two thirds of patients. Accordingly, stent thrombosis carries a 30-day mortality risk of 10-25%. The mechanisms responsible for clot formation are multifactorial, including patient factors (smoking, diabetes, hematologic disorders, etc.), choice of stent, and post-procedural factors (duration of antiplatelet therapy, adherence to follow-up).

Although drug-eluting stents continue to represent a major medical advance for angioplasty, there is no evidence to suggest reduced frequency of thrombosis with DES compared to older BMS. What is more, while thrombosis occurs immediately (<24 hours) with BMS, DES have been associated with stent thrombosis up to 3 years after implantation, a phenomenon not seen prior. Explanations may lie in the very nature that these new stents are designed to function. A stent represents a foreign object in the body, and placement of a stent will inevitably lead to damage of a blood vessel's lining (endothelium). Drug-eluting stents, by their nature, prevents the formation of a new endothelial layer. Endothelialization is a hallmark of vascular healing and is important for the prevention of thrombus formation. Without proper healing, the risk of clot formation persists for a much longer period of time. For drug-eluting stents, the time course of complete healing in humans is unknown. Thus, clotting suppressant agents are routinely given during placement, and anti-clotting agents are continued well after implantation.

In-stent restenosis (ISR) 
As stated earlier, DES were designed to specifically combat issues of restenosis that occurred with BMS. Though less frequent with drug-eluting stents, restenosis still occurs with DES. The process of restenosis is attributable to a phenomenon known as neointimal hyperplasia. In brief, the process begins with damage to the arterial wall, which can occur in the form of stretch injury during stent positioning or mechanical injury (tearing of vessel lining) during stent deployment. Following injury, platelets, smooth muscle cells, and inflammatory cells (macrophages) will gather at the damaged site and begin the repair process. This can involve the deposition of collagen, proliferation of smooth muscle, and creation of a new vessel lining. However, this process can lead to thickening of the arterial walls and decreased lumen space, resulting in stenosis.

Since the advent of DES technology, the incidence of ISR has significantly decreased. While rates of ISR ranged from 20-35% with BMS, DES has reduced the incidence to about 5-10%. This improvement has resulted in the near-elimination of BMS from clinical use; however, research efforts continue on newer-generation sirolimus-based stents, as well as pioneering image-guided stent placement procedures.

Alternatives to stents
Pharmacological therapy for coronary artery disease may be indicated instead of or in addition to invasive treatment. For those requiring percutaneous coronary intervention or surgery, medical therapy should be viewed as complementary to revascularization procedures, rather than an opposing strategy.

Coronary artery bypass graft surgery is the best treatment for some patients.  Differences between outcomes with stenting and with coronary artery bypass surgery (CABG) are a point of controversy. A recent study comparing the outcomes of all patients in New York state treated with CABG or percutaneous coronary intervention (PCI) demonstrated CABG was superior to PCI with DES in multiple-vessel coronary artery disease .  Patients treated with CABG had lower rates of death or myocardial infarction than treatment with a drug-eluting stent.  Patients undergoing CABG also had lower rates of repeat revascularization.

Two major randomized controlled trials comparing CABG and DES are either completed or ongoing, and have published results - Synergy Between Percutaneous Coronary Intervention With Taxus and Cardiac Surgery (SYNTAX) and Future Revascularization Evaluation in Patients With Diabetes Mellitus—Optimal Management of Multivessel Disease (FREEDOM). The five-year follow-up results of SYNTAX showed, depending on the complexity of coronary vessel disease, PCI was either equally effective or inferior to CABG. Similarly, results from the FREEDOM trial published after five years showed CABG to be superior to PCI in reducing rates of death and myocardial infarction. Both trials found either increased or insignificantly different rates of stroke with CABG as compared to PCI. The registries of the nonrandomized patients screened for these trials may provide as many robust data regarding revascularization outcomes as the randomized analysis.

Other studies, including the ARTS II registry, suggest drug-eluting stenting is not inferior to coronary bypass for the treatment of multiple-vessel coronary disease. The ARTS II registry compared a cohort of patients treated with multiple-vessel stenting with DES, to the historical CABG cohort in the ARTS I trial (itself a randomized comparison between multiple-vessel bare-metal stenting vs. CABG.) At three-year follow-up, major adverse cardiac events were comparable between the ARTS II DES group and the ARTS I CABG group. Reintervention was lower in the ARTS I CABG group.
In all comparison studies of stenting vs. bypass surgery, it is worth noting that only a small minority of patients with multiple-vessel coronary disease have been eligible for inclusion in the studies, and for most patients, clinical judgement by experienced operators suggest one or the other approach is preferred.

Design  

Drug-eluting stents generally consist of three parts - the stent platform, a polymer coating that binds the drug to the stent and releases the drug, and the drug itself.

The stent platform itself is an expandable framework, generally with an elaborate mesh-like design to allow expansion, flexibility, and in some cases the ability to make or enlarge side openings for side vessels.  The first DES were stainless steel alloys composed of iron, nickel, and chromium and were based on existing bare metal stents.  These stents were hard to visualize with medical imaging, posed a risk of causing allergic responses, and were difficult to deliver. Subsequent new alloys were used, namely cobalt-chrome and platinum chrome, with improved performance. Recently, bioresorbable stents have been developed in which the stent itself dissolves over time. As of 2009, materials that had been explored for use included magnesium, polylactic acid, polycarbonate polymers, and salicylic acid polymers.  Resorbable stents have held the promise of providing an acute treatment that would eventually allow the vessel to function normally, without leaving a permanent device behind.

One to three or more layers of polymer can be used in the coating, e.g., a base layer for adhesion, a main layer that holds and elutes (releases) the drug into the arterial wall by contact transfer, and sometimes a top coat to slow down the release of the drug and extend its effect. The first few drug-eluting stents to be licensed used durable coatings. The first generation of coatings appear to have caused immunological reactions at times, and some possibly led to thrombosis. This has driven experimentation and development of new coating approaches.

The drug is mainly used to inhibit neointimal growth due to the proliferation of smooth muscle cells that would cause restenosis. Much of the neointimal hyperplasia seems to be caused by inflammation. Hence, immunosuppressive and antiproliferative drugs are used. Sirolimus, paclitaxel, and everolimus were previously used for other medical applications and have been included in licensed DES.

Vascular stents are Class III medical devices that are intended for use as a mechanical radial support to enhance vessel patency over the intended design life of the device. Device properties and the intended use are dependent on results from extensive testing that involve mechanical tests on universal testing machines. Types of mechanical test include bend testing, fatigue testing, radial loading, tensile testing, and torsion testing. Depending on the type of vascular stent, its location and intended use, other tests may include crush resistance, kink resistance, corrosion, coating integrity, and more.

History

The first procedure to treat blocked coronary arteries was coronary artery bypass graft surgery (CABG), wherein a section of vein or artery from elsewhere in the body is used to bypass the diseased segment of coronary artery. In 1977, Andreas Grüntzig introduced percutaneous transluminal coronary angioplasty (PTCA), also called balloon angioplasty, in which a catheter was introduced through a peripheral artery and a balloon expanded to dilate the narrowed segment of artery. As equipment and techniques improved, the use of PTCA rapidly increased, and by the mid-1980s, PTCA and CABG were being performed at equivalent rates. Balloon angioplasty was generally effective and safe, but restenosis was frequent, occurring in  about 30–40% of cases, usually within the first year after dilation. In about 3% of balloon angioplasty cases, failure of the dilation and acute or threatened closure of the coronary artery (often because of dissection) prompted emergency CABGs.

Charles Theodore Dotter and Melvin Judkins had proposed using prosthetic devices inside arteries in the leg to maintain blood flow after dilation as early as 1964.  In 1986, Puel and Sigwart implanted the first coronary stent in a human patient. Several trials in the 1990s showed the superiority of stent placement over balloon angioplasty.  Restenosis was reduced because the stent acted as a scaffold to hold open the dilated segment of artery. Acute closure of the coronary artery (and the requirement for emergency CABG) was reduced, because the stent repaired dissections of the arterial wall. By 1999, stents were used in 84% of percutaneous coronary interventions (i.e., those done via a catheter, and not by open-chest surgery).

Early difficulties with coronary stents included a risk of early thrombosis (clotting) resulting in occlusion of the stent. Coating stainless steel stents with other substances such as platinum or gold did not eliminate this problem. High-pressure balloon expansion of the stent to ensure its full apposition to the arterial wall, combined with drug therapy using aspirin and another inhibitor of platelet aggregation (usually ticlopidine or clopidogrel) nearly eliminated this risk of early stent thrombosis.

Though it occurred less frequently than with balloon angioplasty or other techniques, stents nonetheless remained vulnerable to restenosis, caused almost exclusively by neointimal tissue growth. To address this issue, developers of drug-eluting stents used the devices themselves as a tool for delivering medication directly to the arterial wall.  While initial efforts were unsuccessful, the release (elution) of drugs with certain specific physicochemical properties from the stent was shown in 2001 to achieve high concentrations of the drug locally, directly at the target lesion, with minimal systemic side effects.  As currently used in clinical practice, "drug-eluting" stents refers to metal stents that elute a drug designed to limit the growth of neointimal scar tissue, thus reducing the likelihood of stent restenosis.

The first successful trials were of sirolimus-eluting stents. A clinical trial in 2002 led to approval of the sirolimus-eluting Cypher stent in Europe in 2002. After a larger pivotal trial (one designed for the purpose of achieving FDA approval), published in 2003, the device received FDA approval and was released in the U.S. in 2003. Soon thereafter, a series of trials of paclitaxel-eluting stents led to FDA approval of the Taxus stent in 2004. Both sirolimus and paclitaxel are natural products, making the drug-eluting stents a specific kind of application totally dominated by drugs directly derived from natural sources.

The first resorbable stent tested in humans was developed by the Igaki Medical Planning Company in Japan and was constructed from poly-L-lactic acid (a form of polylactic acid); they published their initial results in 2000. The German company Biotronik developed a magnesium absorbable stent and published clinical results in 2007.  The first company to bring a bioresorbable stent to market was Abbott Vascular which received a European marketing approval in September 2012; the second was Elixir which received its CE mark in May 2013.
In 2017, Abbott pulled its bioabsorbable stent, Absorb, from the European market after negative press regarding the device. Boston Scientific also announced termination of its Renuvia bioresorbable coronary stent program as studies showed higher risk of serious adverse events.

Due to challenges in developing resorbable stents, many manufacturers have focused efforts on targeting or reducing drug-release through bioabsorbable-polymer coatings. Boston Scientific's Synergy bioabsorbable polymer stent has been shown potential to reduce length of dual antiplatelet therapy post-implantation. MicroPort's Firehawk target eluting stent has been shown to be non-inferior to traditional drug-eluting stents while using one-third of the amount of equivalent drug.

Society and culture

In 2012, a meta-analysis of clinical trial data was published, showing that, for people with stable coronary artery disease, DES has no benefit compared to treatment with drugs.  The New York Times interviewed the study's main author, who said that more than half of patients with stable coronary artery disease were implanted with stents without even trying drug treatment and that he believed this happened because hospitals and doctors wanted to make more money. In 2013 the Times of India reported that DES were widely overused and that Indian distributors used profits from high markups on DES to bribe doctors to use them.   In 2014 an investigation by the Maharashtra Food and Drug Administration found that high markups and bribery related to DES was still widespread.

References

Further reading
 (layperson overview, subscription required)
 (journal review article, subscription required)

External links
 Drug-Eluting Stents — Angioplasty.Org  Good overview and detail
 CIMIT Center For Integration of Medicine and Innovative Technology
 Cypher DES
  Image of the experimental CoStar Cobalt chrome stent
 Safety Profile of Drug-eluting Stents Similar to Bare-metal Stents (re G.W.Stone's presentation at TCT2006) 
 TCT: Transcatheter Cardiovascular Therapeutics Meeting Coverage peer-reviewed articles from Medpage Today

Drug delivery devices
Implants (medicine)
Interventional cardiology